The Nullity of Marriage Act 1971 was an act that defined valid reasons for annulment according to British law. This act was the first time in British law that marriage was explicitly defined by statute as being between a male and a female. A marriage could therefore be annulled if the partners were not respectively male and female.

The provisions of the Act were incorporated into the Matrimonial Causes Act 1973 and the Act itself was repealed. The provision that a marriage must be between a male and a female has subsequently been overturned by the Marriage (Same Sex Couples) Act 2013.

Contents 
The first clause of the act states that lack of consent in a marriage due to mental health problems, duress, or a mistake in getting married were grounds for a marriage to be void. The second clause stated that, if the partners getting married were not male and female, then the marriage was void. The third clause states that epilepsy attacks at the time of marriage was no longer a valid reason for annulment. The act only applied to marriages if there had been a marriage ceremony. The act came into force on August 1, 1971.

See also
 Same-sex marriage in the United Kingdom
 Marriage in the United Kingdom

References

External links
 Commentary on the Nullity of Marriage Act 1971, from (1972), STATUTES. The Modern Law Review, 35: 57–72. doi: 10.1111/j.1468-2230.1972.tb01319.x

United Kingdom Acts of Parliament 1971
Repealed United Kingdom Acts of Parliament
Marriage law in the United Kingdom